World No. 139 Clara Tauson won her first WTA singles tennis title as a qualifier, defeating Viktorija Golubic in the final of the 2021 Lyon Open, 6–4, 6–1. Tauson did not drop a set throughout the entire tournament, including qualifying rounds, and dropped just 35 games across seven matches. Tauson became the second Danish player in history, after Caroline Wozniacki, to win a WTA Tour singles title. The final match was the first WTA singles final to be contested between two qualifiers since the 2017 Japan Women's Open.

Sofia Kenin was the defending champion, but chose not to participate after undergoing surgery for appendicitis.

Seeds

Draw

Finals

Top half

Bottom half

Qualifying

Seeds

Qualifiers

Qualifying draw

First qualifier

Second qualifier

Third qualifier

Fourth qualifier

Fifth qualifier

Sixth qualifier

References

External links
Main Draw  
Qualifying Draw

2021 Lyon Open (WTA) - 1
Lyon Open (WTA) - 1